Acrolophus minor is a moth of the family Acrolophidae. It was described by Harrison Gray Dyar Jr. in 1903. It is found in North America, including Arizona.

References

Moths described in 1903
minor